The Scientific Committee on Occupational Exposure Limit Values (SCOEL) is a committee of the European Commission established in 1995 to advise on occupational exposure limits for chemicals in the workplace within the framework of:
Directive 98/24/EC, the chemical agents directive; and
Directive 90/394/EEC, the carcinogens at work directive.

It is composed of scientists who are expert in chemistry, toxicology, epidemiology, occupational medicine or industrial hygiene, and reviews available information, recommending exposure limits where possible.

References

External links

European Commission
1995 establishments in the European Union
Occupational safety and health organizations
Regulation of chemicals in the European Union
Toxicology organizations